AlterG, Inc. is an American medical device company founded in 2005 by Sean Whalen in Fremont, California. The company makes mobility enhancement products for physical therapy and athletic training. The first product, the Anti-Gravity Treadmill, now includes a product line including the M/F320, Via 400 and 400X, and Pro 200 and 500. In 2013 the company acquired Tibion Corporation and added the Bionic Leg to its list of products. Charles Remsberg is CEO.

History 

Sean Whalen and his father developed the original prototype of the Anti-Gravity Treadmill in the family garage. They used technology developed by NASA to create a treadmill that unweights a user through "differential air pressure". The Nike Oregon Project, runner and coach Alberto Salazar, the Oakland Raiders and the Golden State Warriors tested and used the prototype. In 2007, the Washington Wizards were the first professional sports team to purchase the P200 model, and by 2008, the Miami Heat, Golden State Warriors, Chicago Bulls, Houston Rockets, Houston Texans, and Phoenix Suns all purchased the P200 for their training rooms.

In 2008, the U.S. Food and Drug Administration (FDA) cleared the Anti-Gravity Treadmill, which at the time went by the name G-Trainer, as a medical device applicable for uses in rehabilitation. Since then the company's Anti-Gravity Treadmill has been used for rehabilitating lower extremity injury or surgery, aerobic conditioning, weight control, gait training for neurological conditions, strengthening and conditioning the elderly. The company named Steve Basta as CEO in 2011. Steve is a graduate of the Johns Hopkins Biomedical Engineering program. In 2013, AlterG acquired the Tibion Corporation, and took over production and sales of its flagship product, the Bionic Leg.

Technology 

All of AlterG's products are manufactured and assembled at the company's headquarters in Fremont, CA. The company's line of Anti-Gravity Treadmills and its Bionic Leg both use patented technologies.

Differential air pressure

NASA developed the differential air pressure technique as a way for astronauts to exercise and maintain conditioning in space. In 2012, NASA purchased the P200 model to use for pre-flight and post-flight training of International Space Station astronauts. AlterG now holds a patent for this technology, which employs air pressure to adjust the users body weight on the treadmill between 20% and 100% of normal weight. In 2013, AlterG was named by Fast Company as one of the top 10 most innovative companies in sports for its Anti-Gravity Treadmill. The company's Anti-Gravity Treadmill M320 was cleared by the FDA for use in medical facilities, hospitals, physical therapy clinics, and skilled nursing facilities. Like the other models, the M320 can reduce a user's body weight by up to 80%. The company released the Anti-Gravity Treadmill F320 in 2013. This device is classified as a fitness product and does not meet some of the electrical interference requirements designated by some hospitals.

The Pro Anti-Gravity Treamills are used in professional athlete training and conditioning because of their high top speed of 18 mph.

Intention based therapy

Bob Horst developed the technology behind the Bionic Leg, which contains sensors and robotics that detect and provide force when a patient's weight shifts. The Bionic Leg is a battery-operated external brace that uses information from foot sensors to predict the user's movements while the user walks, sits, and stands.

In professional sports 

The company's Anti-Gravity Treadmill is used by professional sports teams and university sports programs, including the Seattle Seahawks, Miami Heat, Boston Red Sox, Detroit Tigers, Washington Wizards, Golden State Warriors, Oakland Raiders, New York Jets, Atlanta United FC, Texas Rangers, Green Bay Packers, Arizona Diamondbacks, Detroit Lions, Milwaukee Brewers, Los Angeles Dodgers, Buffalo Bills, Pittsburgh Steelers, Toronto Blue Jays, Philadelphia 76ers and Hawthorn Hawks. US Olympic Training Centers also use the Anti-Gravity Treadmill. NBA players Kobe Bryant and LeBron James and former marathon record holder Paula Radcliffe use the Anti-Gravity Treadmill for physical therapy and training. Tom Brady, quarterback for the Tampa Bay Buccaneers, purchased two of the Anti-Gravity Treadmills.

In medicine 

The company's products are used in medical centers and physical therapy clinics for various types of rehabilitation. In the United States, the products are used by Johns Hopkins Medicine, the Mayo Clinic, University of San Francisco, UNC Health Care,  and Stanford Medical Center.

See also 

 Nautilus, Inc.
 Vacuactivus
 Fitbit

References 

Medical technology companies of the United States
Companies based in Fremont, California
Companies established in 2005